Walter Compton may refer to:

Sir Walter Abingdon Compton, 5th Baronet in Hartbury, see Compton baronets
Walter Ames Compton (1911–1990), American medical doctor, pharmacy researcher, and Japanese sword collector
Walter Compton (broadcaster) (1912–1959), American radio and television broadcaster and executive